Nationality words link to articles with information on the nation's poetry or literature (for instance, Irish or France).

Events

Works

English
 Samuel Daniel, The Queenes Arcadia: A pastoral tragecomedie
 John Davies, Bien Venu: Greate Britaines welcome to hir greate friendes, and deere breathren, the Danes
 Thomas Dekker, The Double PP: a Papist in Armes, published anonymously
 Michael Drayton's Poems Lyrick and Pastorall, including "The Ballad of Agincourt"
 John Ford, Fames Memoriall; or, The Earle of Devonshire Deceased, on the death of Charles Blount
 John Hind, Eliosto Libidinoso, contains some verse
 Philip Howard, Earl of Arundel, A Foure-Fould Meditation, of the Foure Last Things, also has been ascribed to Robert Southwell ("RS"), but The Concise Oxford Chronology of English Literature states Howard wrote it
 King James Version of the Bible
 Samuel Rowlands, A Terrible Battell Betweene the Two Consumers of the Whole World: Time and Death
 William Warner, A Continuance of Albions England, sixth edition, containing books xiv-xvi

Other languages

 Jean Passerat, Recueil des oeuvres poétiques de Ian Passerat augmenté de plus de la moitié, outre les précédentes impressions, edited by Jean de Rougevalet, Paris: Morel, published posthumously, France

Births
 c. February 28 - Sir William Davenant (died 1668), English poet and playwright
 March 3 - Edmund Waller (died 1687), English poet and politician
 May 3 - Lorenzo Lippi (died 1664), Italian painter and poet
 Also:
 Karacaoğlan (died 1680), Turkish folk poet and ashik
 Johannes Khuen (died 1675), Bavarian priest, poet and composer
 Junije Palmotić (died 1657), Ragusan dramatist and poet
 Samarth Ramdas (died 1682), Indian Marathi saint and religious poet
 Thomas Washbourne (died 1687), English clergyman and poet

Deaths
 March 2 - Martin Moller (born 1547), German poet and mystic
 May 13 (bur.) - Arthur Golding (born 1535), English translator of prose and poetry
 May 22 - José de Sigüenza (born 1544), Spanish historian, poet and theologian
 September 2 - Karel van Mander (born 1548), Flemish-born Dutch painter and poet
 October 5 - Philippe Desportes (born 1546), French
 November 20 (bur.) - John Lyly (born 1553), English writer, dramatist and poet
 Also:
 Baltasar del Alcázar (born 1530), Spanish
 Simwnt Fychan (born 1535), Welsh language poet and genealogist

Notes

17th-century poetry
Poetry